Daniel Kupsin is а member of the Association of Managers of Russia, former general director of United Media, creator of Business FM radio, financier, businessman.

Overview
Daniel Kupsin was born in Leningrad, Russia in the family of businessman Evgeniy Veniaminovich Kupsin and his wife, Bella Kupsina, a producer. At an early age, Kupsin moved to Switzerland, where he finished at boarding school. Later he moved to the United States, where he received higher education and a degree. In 2004, Kupsin moved from New York City to Moscow.

Education
Kupsin was educated in the US, in American University (Washington). He graduated in finance and corporate finance, and then he graduated the legal magistracy in Touro College (New York). Juris Doctor State of New York (Member of New York State Bar in 2004).

Career
In 1999, while studying, Kupsin founded "Neva telephone company".
In 2004 he was appointed a Vice President of Corporate Finance Investment "Antanta Capital".
In 2005, Kupsin led a Publishing House "Moscow News".
In 2006, he became CEO of his creation of the Management Company "United Media" (newspaper Business & Financial Markets, radio station Business FM, CINEMA FM, the magazine "Popular Finance").
In 2009, he took over as Chairman of the Board of Directors of "Laboratory ANVI" (former "Antiviral") his father Evgeniy Kupsin.

Lab ANVI
NGO "Antiviral" was created by Evgeniy Kupsin in 1994. The biggest brands of the company are "Antigrippin" and "Maximum Antigrippin". In 2011, the company  was sold to AnviLabGroup ProtekGroup.

Business FM
Business FM - the first business talk radio in Russia, talks about global economic trends. For the first time radio embodied the concept "BreakingNews, StreamNews" - news broadcast live immediately after its appearance on news agencies or events in the world. The first example of a continuous news flow in the business media in Russia.

Business FM began on March 1, 2007 in Moscow. Daily audiences reached more 400 thousand listeners. In summer 2009, "United Media" was sold to a group affiliated with NLMK main shareholders.

Together with Kupsin stood at the origins of radio: Dmitry Solopov, Yegor Altman.

Business FM radio station has been recognized as one of the most successful projects in the domestic media market. In 2011 RSPP called "Business FM" best Russian media in the field of business journalism.

Max Telecom
In 2007, the first company in Europe to create a mobile network of the fourth generation. Operator's network covers about 70% of the Bulgarian population and offers a complete package of mobile Internet services.
Following the acquisition in 2013, Max Telecom acquired a license to communicate in standard LTE. In May 2014 the company began to operate the network in major cities in Bulgaria. In May LTE network was officially open to the public in six cities, covering 20% of the population.
Former employees of Max Telecom have been waiting for money for 6 months.
Nearly 200 employees are waiting for money, and the accumulated debts are at least BGN 3,000 per person.

About 20,000 customers who signed contracts with Max Telecom also suffered. Although the mobile service has not been stopped yet, all the operator's stores are already closed.

Corona Resort and Casino 
In 2019, Daniil Kupsin, in partnership with Vin Group Corporation, participates in the Corona Resort & Casino project with an investment attraction of more than $2 billion. Together, they created hotels in Vietnam and several four- and five-star hotels, including Radisson Blue and Phu Quoc.

Recognition 
In 2007, Kupsin was awarded "Media Manager of Russia".
In 2008 Kupsin entered the section "Media Business" in the "Top 1000 Russian Managers" organized by the Publishing house "Kommersant" and the Russian Managers Association. In 2012, Kupsin together with Yegor Altman and Dmitry Solopov became the hero of the book "Hooligans in business: a success story of Business FM" (Author -  Yuri Voskresensky).

The book, published at "Alpina Publisher", became the first Russian business case for creating media business in Russia - radio station Business FM. In 2013, the book was nominated for headings Book Award - an annual award in the case of literary and book online business.

Family
Kupsin is married with four children.

References

Russia: Business news site bfm.ru launches,
Bulgaria's Max Telecom Announces Change of Ownership, 
Business FM Aims for 400,000, 
MAX TELECOM CHANGE OF OWNERSHIP,
Kupsin takes command of Bulgaria's Max Telecom, 
Russian investor acquires Bulgaria's Max Telecom, 

Living people
1977 births
Russian people of Jewish descent
Kogod School of Business alumni
Mass media people from Moscow
Touro College alumni
New York (state) lawyers
Russian businesspeople in the United States